William Iain Henderson (born 21 February 1992) is an Irish professional rugby union player who plays lock for Ulster, Ireland, and the British and Irish Lions. He has been the captain of Ulster since the 2019, and first captained Ireland in 2021.

Early Life
Born in Craigavon, County Armagh, he was educated at Belfast Royal Academy, playing in the school's 1st XV that made the Ulster Schools' Cup final in 2010. In July 2010, he was selected for the Ulster/Leinster team against Connacht/Munster in the exhibition game that opened the Aviva Stadium in Dublin. He was due to study actuarial studies at Heriot-Watt University in Edinburgh, but switched to Queen's University Belfast after he was offered a place at the Ulster Rugby Academy.

Professional Career
He was awarded the £2,000 Jack Kyle Academy Bursary by the Ulster Rugby Official Supporters Club in December 2011, despite missing the first half of the 2011–12 season with a broken leg sustained playing for the Ulster Ravens. He made his debut for the senior Ulster team in April 2012, and signed his first professional contract in October 2012. He represented Ireland at U19 level and at U20 level, including at the 2012 U20 World Championships. He made his senior Ireland debut in November 2012 in the defeat to South Africa in Dublin.

He was named Young Player of the Year at the 2013 Ulster Rugby Awards, and Personality of the Year in the 2021 Awards. He was part of the Ulster team that made the 2013 Pro12 Grand Final and the 2020 Pro14 Grand Final. He made his 100th appearance for Ulster against Leicester Tigers in the European Rugby Champions Cup in January 2019, and was named Ulster's captain, replacing the retiring Rory Best, ahead of the 2019–20 season.

With Ireland, he won the Six Nations Championship in 2014 and 2015, the Grand Slam in 2018, and the Triple Crown in 2022, and played in the Rugby World Cup in 2015 and 2019. He captained Ireland for the first time in February 2021. He was selected for the British and Irish Lions for their 2017 tour to New Zealand and 2021 tour to South Africa.

Honours

Ireland
Six Nations Championship:
Winner (3): 2014, 2015, 2018	
Grand Slam:
Winner (1): 2018
Triple Crown:
Winner (2):2018, 2022

References

External links

Ulster Rugby profile
United Rugby Championship profile
Ireland profile
British & Irish Lions profile

1992 births
Living people
People educated at the Belfast Royal Academy
Irish rugby union players
Ulster Rugby players
Ireland international rugby union players
Ireland Wolfhounds international rugby union players
British & Irish Lions rugby union players from Ireland
Rugby union locks
Rugby union flankers